More Songs of Pain is the fourth self-released music cassette album by singer-songwriter Daniel Johnston, recorded late 1982 and early 1983.
The album was re-released on cassette in 1988 by Stress records, made available in downloadable mp3 format by Emusic in 2000, and in 2003 released on CD by Dual Tone, as the second half of the compilation Early Recordings Volume 1.

Background 
More Songs of Pain was Daniel Johnston's final album recorded in his parents' basement in West Virginia. During the sessions, Johnston was 21-22 and would have been studying for his Senior year at Kent State University in East Liverpool, Ohio, if he had not been taken out of education by his parents out of fear of him failing to graduate. The album is placed between The What of Whom (August 1982) and Yip/Jump Music (April 1983).

The album introduces the recurring character of Joe, a stand-in for Johnston, 'an average guy trying to defeat his demons.' Joe would feature heavily in the lyrics to Hi, How Are You, and would appear on the cover of Retired Boxer.

As well as having an improved sound quality than 'Songs of Pain', 'More' also showcases Johnston becoming less self referential in his lyrics, with only 'More Dead Than Alive' referring back to 'Monkey in a Zoo'.

Legacy 
In 2003, Jason MacNeil writing for PopMatters described Songs of Pain and More Songs of Pain as "Overall easy on the ears," but said that Johnston's "whiney vocals" could be "challenging at times". He also compared the album to later acts such as They Might Be Giants and Ben Folds.

MacNeil also considers "You Put My Love out the Door" as a highlight of the album, calling it "a melodic and somber mid-tempo tune where Johnston pours his heart out yet again about an old flame", but criticized "Never Get To Heaven" as "ragged and average".  In 2006, Kimya Dawson covered "Follow That Dream" for the Daniel Johnston tribute album I Killed The Monster.   In 2010, Douglas Wolk writing for Pitchfork described More Songs of Pain as "a accomplished if less bracing take on a lot of the same themes [...as Songs of Pain]".

When Billboard published their "12 essential Daniel Johnston tracks" list in 2019, "Phantom of My Own Opera" was included. NBC News described More Songs of Pain and Johnston's other 1983 albums as having "oblique, yet touching lyrics", as well as "oddly contagious melodies".

Track listing

Original Cassette

2010 The Story Of An Artist box-set

2019 CD Re-issue

Release History

The Lost Recordings 

Recorded concurrently with 'More Songs Of Pain,' The Lost Recordings is a two-volume set of albums containing previously unreleased material from 1983. The tapes were re-discovered by Johnston in 1990, when they were found underneath his bed. Both volumes of The Lost Recordings contain 'unfinished sketches' and 'half-hearted demos.' Additionally, both album covers are dated 1983; yet, Johnston's official digital download website dates it as 1981 - 1983, whilst his physical media store dates it as 1979 - 1983. Love Defined would later be re-recorded for 'Yip/Jump Music', and 'Happy Talk' would receive a studio recording on 'It's Spooky.' The album also features a shorter version of 'Blue Cloud' from the More Songs of Pain album.

Track listing

Volume One

Volume Two

References 

Daniel Johnston albums
1983 albums
Albums recorded in a home studio